Legislative elections were held in El Salvador on 16 March 2003 to elect 84 deputies to the Legislative Assembly for a term of three years. The main opposition party, the Farabundo Martí National Liberation Front (FMLN), won the most seats in election at 31. However the governing Nationalist Republican Alliance (ARENA) won enough seats to continue in government with the Party of National Conciliation (PCN).

Background
ARENA had controlled the government of El Salvador since winning the 1989 presidential election. The 2003 legislative election was the fifth election since the ending of the Salvadoran Civil War in 1992.

Campaign
In total 11 political parties contested the election but it was seen as being primarily between ARENA and the opposition FMLN. ARENA campaigned for a mandate to continue the economic reforms they had been pursuing but was hurt in the election by a recent six-month strike by doctors. Meanwhile, FMLN won support from those who did not feel they have benefited from the economic reforms introduced by ARENA and they attacked the government over crime and declining economic growth.

There were five deaths during the campaign related to the election and for three days around the election a ban on the sales of alcohol was introduced to prevent any trouble. Election day itself saw problems with the electoral list, with reports of voters not being on the list, while some dead people were listed. Turnout was low with only slightly less than 39% voting.

Results
The FMLN remained the largest party in the Legislative Assembly winning 31 seats the same as the previous election in 2000. ARENA lost two seats, but with their allies the Party of National Conciliation gaining 3 seats, they retained a majority. At the same time as the legislative election, the 262 municipalities held elections with the FMLN retaining the most important post, the mayoralty of San Salvador, when Carlos Rivas Zamora defeated Evelyn Jacir de Lovo of ARENA.

References

El Salvador
Legislative elections in El Salvador
2003 in El Salvador